Cyperus pluricephalus is a species of sedge that is endemic to Somalia.

The species was first formally described by the botanist Kåre Arnstein Lye in 1983.

See also
 List of Cyperus species

References

pluricephalus
Flora of Somalia
Plants described in 1996
Endemic flora of Somalia
Taxa named by Kåre Arnstein Lye